Polly Lam Po Kuen (born 20 April 1982) is a Hong Kong former professional tennis player.

Lam competed for the Hong Kong Fed Cup team between 1999 and 2010, appearing in a total of 32 rubbers across 24 ties, for five singles and seven doubles wins. She was also a Hong Kong representative at the All-China Games, East Asian Games, 2005 Summer Universiade and 2006 Asian Games. 

On the professional tour, Lam featured at ITF circuit level and reached a best singles ranking of 655 in the world.

References

External links
 
 
 

1982 births
Living people
Hong Kong female tennis players
Competitors at the 2005 Summer Universiade
Tennis players at the 2006 Asian Games
Asian Games competitors for Hong Kong